Robert Samuel Langer Jr. FREng (born August 29, 1948) is an American chemical engineer, scientist, entrepreneur, inventor and one of the twelve Institute Professors at the Massachusetts Institute of Technology.

He was formerly the Germeshausen Professor of Chemical and Biomedical Engineering and maintains activity in the Department of Chemical Engineering and the Department of Biological Engineering at MIT. He is also a faculty member of the Harvard–MIT Program in Health Sciences and Technology and the Koch Institute for Integrative Cancer Research.

Langer holds over 1,400 granted or pending patents. He is one of the world's most highly cited researchers and his h-index is now 306 with currently over 381,489 citations. He is a widely recognized and cited researcher in biotechnology, especially in the fields of drug delivery systems and tissue engineering.

He is the most cited engineer in history and 2nd most cited individual in any field, having authored over 1,500 scientific papers, and is also a prolific entrepreneur, having participated in the founding of over 40 biotechnology companies including Moderna.

Langer's research laboratory at MIT is the largest biomedical engineering lab in the world; maintaining over $10 million in annual grants and over 100 researchers.  He has been awarded numerous leading prizes in recognition of his work.

Background and personal life
Langer was born August 29, 1948, in Albany, New York, US. He is an alumnus of The Milne School and received his bachelor's degree from Cornell University in chemical engineering. He earned his Sc.D. in chemical engineering from Massachusetts Institute of Technology in 1974. His dissertation was entitled "Enzymatic regeneration of ATP" and completed under the direction of Clark K. Colton. From 1974–1977 he worked as a postdoctoral fellow at the Children's Hospital Boston and at Harvard Medical School under Judah Folkman. Langer and his wife, Laura, a fellow MIT graduate, have three children.

Contributions to medicine and biotechnology
Langer is widely regarded for his contributions to medicine and biotechnology. He is considered a pioneer of many new technologies, including controlled release systems and transdermal delivery systems, which allow the administration of drugs or extraction of analytes from the body through the skin without needles or other invasive methods.

Langer worked with Judah Folkman at Boston Children's Hospital to isolate the first angiogenesis inhibitor, a macromolecule to block the spread of blood vessels in tumors. Macromolecules tend to be broken down by digestion and blocked by body tissues if they are injected or inhaled, so finding a delivery system for them is difficult. Langer's idea was to encapsulate the angiogenesis inhibitor in a noninflammatory synthetic polymer system that could be implanted in the tumor and control the release of the inhibitor. He eventually invented polymer systems that would work. This discovery is considered to lay the foundation for much of today's drug delivery technology.

Langer also worked with Henry Brem of the Johns Hopkins University Medical School on a drug-delivery system for the treatment of brain cancer, to deliver chemotherapy directly to a tumor site. The wafer implants that he and his teams have designed have become increasingly more sophisticated, and can now deliver multiple drugs, and respond to stimuli. In 2019, he and his team developed and patented a technique whereby microneedle tattoo patches could be used to label people with invisible ink to store medical information subcutaneously. This was presented as a boon to "developing nations" where lack of infrastructure means an absence of medical records. The technology uses a "quantum dot dye that is delivered, along with a vaccine, by a microneedle patch."

Langer is regarded as the founder of tissue engineering in regenerative medicine. He and the researchers in his lab have made advances in tissue engineering, such as the creation of engineered blood vessels and vascularized engineered muscle tissue.  Bioengineered synthetic polymers provide a scaffolding on which new skin, muscle, bone, and entire organs can be grown. With such a substrate in place, victims of serious accidents or birth defects could more easily grow missing tissue. Such polymers can be biocompatible and biodegradable.

Langer is involved in several projects related to diabetes. Alongside Daniel G. Anderson, he has contributed bioengineering work to a project involving teams from MIT, Harvard University and other institutions, to produce an implantable device to treat type 1 diabetes by shielding insulin-producing beta cells from immune system attacks. He is also part of a team at MIT that have developed a drug capsule that could be used to deliver oral doses of insulin to people with type 1 diabetes.

Awards and honors
Langer is the youngest person in history (at 43) to be elected to all three American science academies: the National Academy of Sciences, the National Academy of Engineering and the National Academy of Medicine. He was also elected as a charter member of National Academy of Inventors. He was elected as an International Fellow of the Royal Academy of Engineering in 2010.

Langer has received more than 220 major awards. He is one of three living individuals to have received both the U.S. National Medal of Science and the National Medal of Technology and Innovation.
 1996: Gairdner Foundation International Award
 1998: Lemelson-MIT Prize for invention and innovation
 2002: Othmer Gold Medal
 2002: Dickson Prize in Science
 2002: Charles Stark Draper Prize (considered the equivalent of the Nobel Prize for engineers).
 2003: Golden Plate Award of the American Academy of Achievement
 2003: Harvey Prize in Science & Technology and Human Health.
 2005: Dan David Prize
 2005: Albany Medical Center Prize in Medicine and Biomedical Research.
 2006: United States National Medal of Science from President George W. Bush.
 2008:  Max Planck Research Award 2008
 2008: Prince of Asturias Award for Scientific Research
 2008: Awarded Finland's Millennium Technology Prize for developing innovative biomaterials for controlled drug release.
 2010: Elected an International Fellow of the Royal Academy of Engineering.
 2011: The Economist's Innovation award in the category of bioscience for his proven successes in drug-delivery and tissue engineering.
 2011: Warren Alpert Foundation Prize
 2012: Perkin Medal, recognized as the highest honor given for outstanding work in applied chemistry in the United States.
 2012: Wilhelm Exner Medal.
 2012: Priestley Medal, the highest honor conferred by the American Chemical Society (ACS), for distinguished service in the field of chemistry.
 2013: United States National Medal of Technology and Innovation from President Obama.
 2013: Wolf Prize in Chemistry for conceiving and implementing advances in polymer chemistry that provide both controlled drug-release systems and new biomaterials.
 2013: IEEE Medal for Innovations in Healthcare Technology
 2014: The Biotechnology Industry Organization (BIO) and the Chemical Heritage Foundation selected Robert Langer as the winner of the 2014 Biotechnology Heritage Award for significant contribution to the growth of biotechnology.
 2014: Awarded the $3 million Breakthrough Prize in Life Sciences for his work.
 2014: Kyoto Prize
 2015: Queen Elizabeth Prize for Engineering
 2015: Named Cornell University's 2015 Entrepreneur of the Year.
 2015: Scheele Award
 2015: Kazemi Prize (Royan Institute)
 2015: Hoover Medal
2016: European Inventor Award
 2016: Benjamin Franklin Medal in Life Science
 2017: Kabiller Prize in Nanoscience and Nanomedicine
 2017: Named 1# Translational Researcher in the World by Nature Biotechnology.
 2018: Named 1# Translational Researcher in the World by Nature Biotechnology.
 2018: Leadership Award for Historic Scientific Advancement, American Chemical Society
 2018: Inducted into Advanced Materials Hall of Fame
 2019: Hope Funds for Cancer Award of Excellence in Basic Sciences
 2019: National Library of Medicine (Friends) Distinguished Medical Science Award
 2019: Dreyfus Prize in the Chemical Sciences
 2020: Maurice Marie–Janot Award
 2020: Medalha da Ciência, Highest Distinction for Scientists, Government of Portugal (Portugal's Highest Honor)
 2021: Elected Foreign Associate, Chinese Academy of Engineering
 2021: Biomaterials Global Impact Award
 2021: Falch Lecture Prize, University of Bergen, Norway  
 2021: John P. Merrill Award 
 2021: BBVA Foundation Frontiers of Knowledge Award
 2022: Balzan Prize

He has received numerous other awards, including the 10th Annual Heinz Award in the category of Technology, the Economy and Employment (2003), In 2013 he was awarded the IRI Medal alongside long-time friend George M. Whitesides for outstanding accomplishments in technological innovation that have contributed broadly to the development of industry and the benefit of society. He also received the Rusnano prize that year. He has also given 137 named lectures and commencement speeches.

Langer has honorary degrees from 40 universities from around the world including Harvard, Yale, and Columbia University.

Founder of various biotech companies
Robert Langer has been involved in the founding of many companies, more than twenty in partnership with the venture capital firm Polaris Partners.  Success of these companies and Langer's contribution has been detailed by Harvard Business Review:

 Acusphere
 AIR (acquired by Alkermes and subsequently acquired by Acorda)
 Arsenal Medical
 Arsia (acquired by Eagle Pharmaceuticals)
 BIND Therapeutics (acquired by Pfizer)
 Tarveda Therapeutics (formerly Blend Therapeutics)
 Sontra Medical (acquired by Echo Therapeutics)
 Enzytech (acquired by Alkermes)
 Tissium (formerly Gecko Biomedical)
 InVivo Therapeutics
 Kala
 Landsdowne Labs
 Living Proof (acquired by Unilever)
 Lyra Therapeutics
 Lyndra Therapeutics
 Microchips Biotech (acquired by Dare)
 Moderna
 Momenta (acquired by Johnson and Johnson)
 Olivo Labs (acquired by Shisheido)
 Pervasis (acquired by Shire Pharmaceuticals)
 PixarBio
 Pulmatrix
 PureTech
 Selecta Biosciences
 Semprus Biosciences (acquired by Teleflex)
 Seventh Sense
 SQZ Biotech
 Taris (acquired by Johnson and Johnson)
 Transform (acquired by Johnson and Johnson)
 T2Biosystems
 Frequency Therapeutics
 Sigilon Therapeutics
 Seer Bio

Langer is a member of the Advisory Board of Patient Innovation, a nonprofit, international, multilingual, free venue for patients and caregivers of any disease to share their innovations. He is also a member of the Xconomists, an ad hoc team of editorial advisors for the tech news and media company, Xconomy.

Exhibits at Boston's Logan Airport 
Langer is featured in two different exhibits at Boston's Logan Airport. At terminal C (near Gate 8) in the exhibit '4 centuries of Massachusetts Innovation', Langer and Judah Folkman are listed for 'Cancer breakthrough-1st cancer blood vessel inhibitor'. In terminal E, Massachusetts innovators-Transforming the world, Langer is featured as "Revolutionary Biomedical Technology through Development of Controlled Drug Delivery Systems" (near Gate 12).

References

External links
Langer Lab: Professor Robert Langer
 
Robert S. Langer fact sheet at MIT News Office
Article on BBC News
The Bob Langer and Polaris Company Tree From Acusphere to Momenta to Visterra
 Robert Langer: Exchanges at the frontier – ABC Radio National podcast
 

1948 births
Living people
People from Albany, New York
20th-century American inventors
21st-century American inventors
American chemical engineers
American patent holders
Biotechnologists
Cornell University College of Engineering alumni
Draper Prize winners
Fellows of the American Institute for Medical and Biological Engineering
Fellows of the Biomedical Engineering Society
Harvard University faculty
Jewish American scientists
Jewish chemists
Lemelson–MIT Prize
MIT School of Engineering alumni
MIT School of Engineering faculty
Members of the National Academy of Medicine
Members of the United States National Academy of Sciences
Members of the United States National Academy of Engineering
National Medal of Science laureates
Scientists from New York (state)
Winners of The Economist innovation awards
Wolf Prize in Chemistry laureates
21st-century American Jews
Moderna people
Kyoto laureates in Advanced Technology